Donald Dostie is an American politician in the state of New Hampshire. He is a former member of the New Hampshire House of Representatives, having sat as a Republican from the Coos 1 district from 2020 to 2021.  Dostie was assigned to the Fish and Game and Marine Resources Committee for the 2020–2022 term. Dostie resigned October 27, 2021.

References 

People from Coös County, New Hampshire
Year of birth missing (living people)
Living people
Republican Party members of the New Hampshire House of Representatives